Miguel Posadas (1711–1753) was a Spanish painter. He was born in Aragon, and became a Dominican friar living at Valencia, and painted historical pictures.

References

1711 births
1753 deaths
Painters from Aragon
Spanish Baroque painters
Painters from the Valencian Community
18th-century Spanish painters
18th-century Spanish male artists
Spanish male painters